Gil Parris is an American Grammy-nominated rock, blues, jazz and pop guitarist.  He graduated from Ardsley High School.  After briefly attending the Berklee School of Music, Parris left to tour Europe as part of a musical troupe performing Jesus Christ Superstar before becoming a recording artist. Parris has released six solo albums and played collaboratively with over 20 other groups/artists. Parris is known for his blending of blues, jazz, rock and smooth jazz in his work. He has recorded and toured both as a solo artist and as a sideman with major artists including Dr. John, Blood, Sweat & Tears, Diane Schuur, David Mann, Billy Vera, Bobby Caldwell and Toni Braxton.

Discography

Solo releases
Gil Parris - 1998
Blue Thumb - 2002
Jam This -2003
Live at the Next Door Cafe - 2005
Strength - 2006
Gil Parris and Friends Live DVD - 2007A Certain Beauty - 2009

CollaborationsSyndicate of Soul - Who's Snakin' Who? (with Dr. John, Corery Glover and others)Bluesiana Hurricane - Halfsteppin (with Bill Doggett, Lester Bowie and others)Skallelujah - with Joe FerryStrength - with Toko FuruuchiSecrets - with Toni Braxton
In Front of My Eyes - with Bakithi Kumalo
Harris Bros Horns - with Joel Rosenblatt, Robert Aires and Dave Anderson
A Woman's Love - with Vanesse Thomas
BIG SKA - with Joe Ferry
I'll Take Care of You - with Chuck Jackson and Cissy Houston
Let the Feeling Flow - with Matt Jordan and Kelli Sae
Poseidon's Son - with Kati Mac
Nicole Hart Live NRG! - with Nicole Hart
The Christmas Album - with David Clayton Thomas
Blues for a Sunday Morning - 2000 - Various Artists (Compilation)
Public Domain - 2000 - Various Artists (compilation - Gil Parris was nominated for a Grammy in 2001 for his creative solo guitar arrangement of "Pop Goes the Weasel")
iBod - with Ivan "Funkboy" Bodley
Arenal - with Ronnie Dinoto
In Joy - Gordon James
Live-Terry Silverlight (w/Will Lee, Chris Hunter, Rob Aires, Clifford Carter, etc...)

References

External links 
 Myspace for Gil Parris
 Reverend Gil Parris Guitar Setup and demo

Living people
1977 births
American male guitarists
American pop guitarists
American rock guitarists
American blues guitarists
21st-century American guitarists
21st-century American male musicians